Chris Pullan (born 11 December 1967) is an English former footballer who played in the Football League for Watford, Halifax Town and Maidstone United.

External links
 

English footballers
English Football League players
1967 births
Living people
Watford F.C. players
Halifax Town A.F.C. players
Maidstone United F.C. (1897) players
Association football defenders